There have been several sieges of Lille, France:

The Siege of Lille (1667) during the War of Devolution
The Siege of Lille (1708) during the War of the Spanish Succession
The Siege of Lille (1792) during the French Revolutionary War
The Siege of Lille (1940) during the Second World War